Kutch Gurjar Kshatriya (also known as Mistri or Mestri) are a minority Hindu and one of the Socially and Educationally Backward communities of Gujarat in India, who claim to be Kshatriyas.  They are an artisan community related with Kadia works. They are also known as the Mistri or Mistris of Kutch.

History

The community is believed to be from Kota and first entered into Saurashtra and founded 36 villages in the area, while others moved further into Kutch. Around 1177–78 AD (VS 1234), a major group migrated to Kutch from Saurashtra under the leadership of Patel Ganga Maru. They settled in the village of Dhaneti. There are several Parias of the community, located near village pond of Dhaneti, standing as memorials of the war that was fought in 1178 AD. The community members still go once every year to offer pooja and their respects to their fore-fathers.

This group, later, made their distinct identity not only by building historical forts, palaces, temples and architects not only in Kutch but also all over British India, primarily in the fields of railways and coal mining.

The Kutch Gurjar Kshatriyas left Dhaneti and went on to establish eighteen villages in Kutch which were granted to them by the King: Anjar, Sinugra, Khambhra, Nagalpar, Khedoi, Madhapar, Hajapar, Kukma, Galpadar, Reha, Vidi, Jambudi, Devaliya, Lovaria, Nagor, Meghpar, Chandiya and Kumbharia.

Over the centuries, they have been known or identified by some other names like Kadias, Kadia Kshatriyas and Kumar Gnati.

Culture
They are a Hindu community. Some are followers of Swaminarayan and Pranami sect of Hinduism, They are vegetarian in diet and avoid consumption of alcohol. The staple food is khichdi, vegetables, pulses and butter-milk.

Clans 
The community consists of clans like Rathod, Chauhan, Chawda, Jethwa, Yadav, Chudasama, Parmar, Taunk, Solanki, Sawaria, Vaghela, Vegad, Varu, Maru, Gohil, Padhiyar, Bhalsod, etc., who enjoy same status. However, most of people prefer to prefix Mistri to their name.

Marriage 
The community  are an endogamous community who practice the principle of clan exogamy. Dowry is generally not asked for, neither practice of bride price is there in community. Divorce is generally not encouraged; however, divorce can be claimed in certain cases.

Betrothal ceremony generally precedes marriage, which is held usually within one year of engagement and marriage is observed as per Hindu rites by taking seven circumambulation of fire.

Widow remarriage (ghargenu) is allowed, where the women is usually married outside husband's family.

In Kutch

The Kutch Gurjar Kshatriyas were master craftsmen, architects and contractors and have played a major role in erection and construction of the majority of forts, palaces and architecture of Kutch. It was because of this they came to be known as Mistri in Kutch.

Indian railways

It was during 1850 to 1930 AD that the KGK migrated outside Kutch and were involved in the construction of major rail-bridges and the laying down of railway tracks in almost all major rail routes of undivided British India doing the "Railway Thekedari" (Railway Contractors also Thikadari) and as Thekedar (or Thikadar) in Irrigation projects and Forest Department and Public Works Department. They have also done major roadway, road bridges, canal works, irrigation dams and barrage work throughout British India from 1850 to 1980. The communities largest contribution is in the building of the early railway lines and bridges throughout British India. Their works in Railway construction span from 1850 to 1980 for more than one and a quarter of century.

Docks, dams and canals in British India

The KGK contributed to the building of docks, dams, barrages and irrigation canals between 1850 and 1980, and they in the eighteenth century had been among the communities who built the first ports of Bombay and Hornby Vellard. Other docks were developed in Bombay during 1870–1895 (Prince's Docks built in 1885 and Victoria Docks built in 1891) in which many Mistris of Kutch and Kadia Kshatriyas of Saurashtra worked. The Mandavi Docks, bridge over Rukhmavati at Mandavi and many road bridges across territories of British India are built by the community using their mason's skills.

Mining

In the regions of British India known as Bengal, Bihar and Orissa, the Kutch Gurjar Kshatriyas pioneered Indian involvement in coal mining from 1894. They broke the previous monopolies held by British and other Europeans, establishing many collieries at Jharia coalfields and Ranigunj coalfield.

Seth Khora Ramji of Sinugra was the first Indian to break the British monopoly in the Jharia Coalfields. Natwarlal Devram Jethwa says that

Present status

Distribution in India
The community members are found scattered throughout India and Community's associations exist in the states of Gujarat, Maharashtra, Karnataka, Andhra Pradesh, Telangana, Karnataka, Tamil Nadu, Rajasthan, Delhi, Uttar Pradesh, Madhya Pradesh, Chhattisgarh, Jharkhand, Bihar, Orissa and West Bengal.

Present day identity
The community on national level is referred as "Kutch Gurjar Kshatriya" mostly in present-day India. However, the "Mistri", which was mostly used during the last century and before is nowadays only used in Kutch and Gujarat. The term Mestri to refer to community is recognized by Government of Gujarat and  the Other Backward Class Certificate as per the Bakshi Panch report.

References

Notes

Tribes of Kutch
Rajput clans of Gujarat
Kutch district
Hindu communities